Josh Coughlin (born 29 September 1997) is an English cricketer. He made his first-class debut on 26 June 2016 for Durham against a touring Sri Lanka A side. Coughlin was released by Durham ahead of the 2021 County Championship.

References

External links
 

1997 births
Living people
English cricketers
Durham cricketers
Northumberland cricketers
English cricketers of the 21st century
Cricketers from Sunderland